The Battle of Šuplji Kamen between the Serbian Chetnik Organization and the Ottoman army under Hamdi Pasha, took place on 27 May 1904.

Prelude
On 25 April, two bands (četa) of some 20 fighters under voivodes Anđelko Aleksić and Đorđe Cvetković swore oath in a ceremony of the Serbian Committee (Milorad Gođevac, Vasa Jovanović, Žika Rafajlović, Luka Ćelović and General Jovan Atanacković), with prota Nikola Stefanović holding the prayers. The Committee had prepared the formation of the first bands for a number of months. The Chetniks were sent for Poreče, and on 8 May they headed out from Vranje, to Buštranje, which was divided between Serbia and the Ottoman Empire.

History
The Chetniks were escorted by Vasilije Trbić, who told them that the best way was to go through the Kozjak and then down to the Vardar. The two voivodes however, wanted the fastest route, through the Kumanovo plains and then to Četirac. They managed to enter Turkish territory but were subsequently exposed in the plain Albanian and Turkish villages, and the Ottomans closed in on them from all sides, and they decided to stay on the Šuplji Kamen, which gave them little defence instead of meeting the army on the plains; in broad daylight, the Ottoman military easily poured bombs over the hill and killed all 24 of the Chetniks on 27 May.

According to Serbian state documents, the death toll was 24 Chetniks, a zaptı (Ottoman gendarmerie), and three Ottoman soldiers. Serbian deputy Ristić, according to the document, named Žika Rafajlović as the organizer of the band, and that "such adventures and thoughtless treacherous actions should be stopped".

List of the dead
 Vojvoda Anđelko Aleksić of Midinaca
 Krsta Mihailović of Brezna near Tetovo
 Marko Veljković of Bukovljana near Kumanovo
 Đorđe Cvetković of Labuništa in Drimkol
 Manojlo Anastasijević of Elovec near Tetovo
 Micko Kuzmanović of Midinaca
 Milan Drndarević of Prilep
 Milutin Stojković of Jagodina
 Stevan Šutović of Kuča
 Koce Arizanović-Poreče
 Jovan Radosavljević of Ibarskog Kolašin
 Toma Vasiljević of Dragačeva
 Spira Pelivan of Tetovo
 Đorđe Jeleković of Vranje
 Spasa Janković of Vranja
 Proka Stojanović of Poreče
 Stojan Novaković of Poreče
 Bilan Čoković of Gostivar
 Gruja Stevković of Gostivar
 Mihajlo Kocić of Valjevo
 Đoše Kocević of Margara near Prilep

References

Sources

Suplji Kamen
Military history of North Macedonia
1904 in the Ottoman Empire
1904 in Serbia
Conflicts in 1904
Chetniks of the Macedonian Struggle
May 1904 events